The Black River Bridge carries U.S. Route 67 (US 67) (Future Interstate 57 (I-57)) across the Black River in Pocahontas, Arkansas. The bridge is a twin span, each carrying two lanes of traffic. The northern bridge was a historic structure, built in 1934 by the Pittsburgh-Des Moines Steel Co., and was listed on the National Register of Historic Places. In 2016 demolition began on the northern bridge, and it was delisted in 2018. It was one of three surviving swing bridges in the state. The southern bridge is a modern steel girder structure, built in 1986, whose construction rendered the swing section inoperative.

See also

List of bridges documented by the Historic American Engineering Record in Arkansas
List of bridges on the National Register of Historic Places in Arkansas
National Register of Historic Places listings in Randolph County, Arkansas

References

External links

Encyclopedia of Arkansas History & Culture entry

Historic American Engineering Record in Arkansas
Road bridges on the National Register of Historic Places in Arkansas
Bridges completed in 1934
U.S. Route 67
Bridges of the United States Numbered Highway System
Swing bridges in the United States
Steel bridges in the United States
National Register of Historic Places in Randolph County, Arkansas
Girder bridges in the United States
Warren truss bridges in the United States
Parker truss bridges in the United States
Former National Register of Historic Places in Arkansas
Demolished buildings and structures in Arkansas
1934 establishments in Arkansas
Former road bridges in the United States
2016 disestablishments in Arkansas
Transportation in Randolph County, Arkansas
Black River (Arkansas–Missouri)